The British Formula One Championship, often abbreviated to British F1, was a Formula One motor racing championship held in the United Kingdom. It was often referred to as the Aurora AFX Formula One series due to the Aurora company's sponsorship of the series for three of the four seasons.

The long established Cosworth DFV engine helped make the series possible between 1978 and 1980. As in the South African Formula One Championship a decade or so before, second hand cars from manufacturers like Lotus and Fittipaldi Automotive were run by many entrants, although some, such as the March 781, were built specifically for the series. In 1980  Desiré Wilson became the only woman to win a Formula One race. She won at Brands Hatch driving a Wolf.

Origins
The British Formula One Championship was a successor to the older Group 8 Shellsport Championship, which had previously run for Formula 5000 cars. In 1977 the series was opened up to allow Formula One cars to race and the BRSCC upgraded it to a full Formula One championship a year later. Formula Two cars were also present on the grid to make up the numbers.

Champions

† x/y: Competed in x races of the season total y.

References

External links
GEL Motorsport Information Page: The Formula One Archives
Quintin Cloud's Formula One Records: 1982 British Formula 1 Series

 
1978 establishments in the United Kingdom
1982 disestablishments in the United Kingdom